Glenn High School can refer to:
 A number of institutions named John Glenn High School (disambiguation)
 Robert B. Glenn High School 
 Glenn High School (Leander, Texas)